Dalida was a French singer, actress, dancer and record producer. Her songs have often appeared as soundtrack in movies and TV series, sometimes her originals, and sometimes covers.

The following Dalida songs have appeared in the formentioned motion pictures or TV series during and after her life:

References

Music in motion pictures and TV
Dalida in motion pictures and TV